Samad (also Samad Agha; in Persian: صمد) is a fictional character created by Iranian director and actor, Parviz Sayyad. Samad was firstly characterized in a famous Iranian television series,  (1967–1970), as a country boy.

Creation
In the Iranian Sarkar Ostvar television series there was a naive, country boy character without a name played by Parviz Sayyad. On the show, the country boy was frequently arrested for his ignorance. After a poll done by National Iranian Television (NITV), the TV series rated popular and people were also asking why the country boy was no longer in the series. After in which, Sayyad wrote a screenplay based on that country boy character and named him Samad.

Characteristics
Samad likes to be called "Mr. Samad".
Samad loves his mother, Nene Agha very much, she was played by actress Farrokhlagha Houshmand.
Samad is in love with Laila, the daughter of Kadkhoda (village chief) and his competitor in his sentimental attempts is Einullah, the son of Mash Baqer, a rich man.
Samad's frequent gag in the films is using his finger as a defense mechanism. he beats the enemies by poking their eyes.

Filmography

Television 

 1967 to 1970 – , this was the precursor to the show.
 1974 – 
 1975 – 

Film
 1971 – 
 1972 – 
 1972 – 
 1973 – 
 1974 – 
 1975 – 
 1977 – 
 1978 – 
 1979 – 
 1986 – Samad Goes to War
 1988 – Samad Returns from the War

Theater
 Parviz Sayyad and His Samad (1994)
 Hadi Khorsandi and His Samad (1998)
 Samad Goes to War (1990)
 Samad Returns From War (1992)

References

Fictional Iranian people